Nanos Research (previously SES Research) is a Canadian public opinion and research company that was established in 1987 by Nik Nanos. 

For the 2004 Federal Election, the company launched a publicly available nightly tracking program, the first of its kind in Canadian election history.

References
McMurdy, Derdre. "Who is this man, and why is he always right?" The Ottawa Citizen. Ottawa, Ont.: Oct 22, 2007. pg. A.5
Bea Vongdouangchanh and Kady O’Malley. “Inside the poll story – who got it right, who got it wrong, and why?” Policy Options Magazine, Montreal, Que.: March 2006. Vol. 26 No. 3, p. 68
Christian Bourque and Craig Worden. “Measuring voting intention and projecting outcomes for the 2006 Canadian federal election” Vue Magazine, Mississauga, Ont.: April 2006, p. 10

External links
 Official website

Public opinion research companies